Local elections were held on 24 November 2018 in Taiwan, to elect county magistrates (city mayors), county (city) councilors, township mayors, township councilors and chiefs of village (borough) in 6 municipalities and 16 counties (cities). Elected officials would serve a four-year term. Polling stations were open from 08:00 to 16:00 on the election day.

The elections resulted in a substantial defeat for the DPP. The DPP previously held 13 of 22 municipalities and counties, but won only 6 in this election due to widespread public distrust, a de facto vote of no confidence on President Tsai's Administration, both politically (relations with China), economically (agriculture, tourism), and socially (pollution, labor laws, wages), which were reflected in the series of referendum results. The KMT won back executive control of 7 municipalities and counties from the DPP, while Ko Wen-je won his re-election for Taipei mayor.

Background
This local election was seen as the first test for the incumbent President Tsai Ing-wen since assuming office in May 2016. The Central Election Commission opened election registration to candidates on 27 August 2018.

The Democratic Progressive Party has won the popular vote against the Kuomintang in all of the last three elections. This trend has continued in the 2016 elections, where the Democratic Progressive Party won a majority in the Legislative Yuan with 68 seats and the presidency.

Results summary

Magistrate and mayor elections

Opinion polls

Results

Councillor elections

Nominations

Opinion polls

Results

Township/city mayor elections

Nominations

Results

Township/city council elections

Nominations

Results

Village chief elections

Nominations

Results

Aftermath
President Tsai Ing-wen announced her resignation as chairperson for the Democratic Progressive Party; Premier William Lai also unilaterally announced his resignation on Facebook ; his resignation was approved in 2019. The DPP secretary general Hung Yao-fu and Secretary-General to the President Chen Chu also announced their resignations. Following the elections, the Taiwanese foreign minister claimed that China had meddled in the elections.

Defector and self-proclaimed former spy William Wang claimed that the government of China had successfully supported candidates in the 2018 Taiwanese local elections.

See also
 2019 Taiwanese legislative by-elections
 2020 Kaohsiung mayoral recall vote
 2020 Taiwanese presidential election
 2020 Taiwanese legislative election

Notes

References

Local
Local elections in Taiwan
Taiwan